Information and Computation is a closed-access computer science journal published by Elsevier (formerly Academic Press). The journal was founded in 1957 under its former name Information and Control and given its current title in 1987. , the current editor-in-chief is David Peleg. The journal publishes 12 issues a year.

History 
Information and Computation was founded as Information and Control in 1957 at the initiative of Leon Brillouin and under the editorship of Leon Brillouin, Colin Cherry and Peter Elias. Murray Eden joined as editor in 1962 and became sole editor-in-chief in 1967. He was succeeded by Albert R. Meyer in 1981, under whose editorship the journal was rebranded Information and Computation in 1987 in response to the shifted focus of the journal towards theory of computation and away from control theory. In 2020, Albert Mayer was succeeded by David Peleg as editor-in-chief of the journal.

Indexing 
All articles from the Information and Computation journal can be viewed on indexing services like Scopus and Science Citation Index. They are also reviewed cover-to-cover by the AMS Mathematical Reviews and zbMATH and included in the computer science database DBLP. According to the Journal Citation Reports, Information and Computation has a 2021 impact factor of 1.24.

Landmark publications

On certain formal properties of grammars 

 

Description: This article introduced what is now known as the Chomsky hierarchy, a containment hierarchy of classes of formal grammars that generate formal languages.

A formal theory of inductive inference 

 

Description: This was the beginning of algorithmic information theory and Kolmogorov complexity. Note that though Kolmogorov complexity is named after Andrey Kolmogorov, he said that the seeds of that idea are due to Ray Solomonoff. Andrey Kolmogorov contributed a lot to this area but in later articles.

Fuzzy sets 

 

Description: The seminal paper published in 1965 provides details on the mathematics of fuzzy set theory. , it is the most cited paper published in the journal.

On the translation of languages from left to right 

 

Description: LR parser, which does bottom up parsing for deterministic context-free languages. Later derived parsers, such as the LALR parser, have been and continue to be standard practice, such as in Yacc and descendants.

Language identification in the limit 

 

Description: This paper created algorithmic learning theory. , it is the second most cited paper published in the journal.

A Calculus of Mobile Processes, I 

 

Description: This paper first introduced the π-calculus.  , it is the third most cited paper published in the journal and the most cited paper published since the journal assumed its current name.

References

External links 
 

Computer science journals
Elsevier academic journals
Publications established in 1957